March of Progress is the ninth studio album by progressive metal band Threshold. It is the first studio album on which original lead vocalist Damian Wilson sings since his return in 2007. It is also their second album on their current label, Nuclear Blast. The limited edition includes a bonus track, "Divinity".

Track listing

Notes 
 Bonus track on limited edition US and digipack releases.

Members 
Damian Wilson – lead vocals
Karl Groom – guitar, backing vocals
Richard West – keyboards
Johanne James – drums
Steve Anderson – bass guitar
Pete Morten – guitar

References

2012 albums
Nuclear Blast albums
Threshold (band) albums